State Route 254 (SR 254) is a west–east state highway in Davidson County, Tennessee. For the majority of its length, it forms part of Old Hickory Boulevard, with the rest known as Bell Road.

Route description 
From its beginning at SR 100, SR 254 forms part of Old Hickory Boulevard.  It passes between Percy Warner Park and Edwin Warner Park to enter Forest Hills.  This is a predominantly residential area.  After it intersects Granny White Pike, Old Hickory Boulevard goes north of Brentwood and then crosses I-65 at exit 74.  It continues through more residential area until the intersection with US 31A/US 41A (Nolensville Pike).  Just east of this intersection, State Route 254 leaves Old Hickory Boulevard and becomes Bell Road, whence it continues as Bell Road past I-24 exit 59 to US 41/US 70S (Murfreesboro Pike).  From that intersection, Bell Road continues on without a designation.

Names 
Old Hickory Boulevard - from SR 100 to Old Hickory Boulevard/Benzing Road/Bell Road.
Bell Road - from Old Hickory Boulevard to Murfreesboro Pike.

Major intersections

See also 
List of state routes in Tennessee

References 

254